Licania splendens is a tree in the family Chrysobalanaceae. The specific epithet  is from the Latin meaning "shining", referring to surfaces of the dried leaves.

Description
The bark is smooth to scaly. The strong durable timber is locally used for railway ties and in saltwater construction. The fruit is considered edible.

Distribution and habitat
Licania splendens grows naturally in Thailand and western Malesia. Its habitat is dipterocarp forests, swamps and seashores from sea-level to  altitude.

References

splendens
Trees of Thailand
Trees of Malesia
Taxonomy articles created by Polbot
Taxobox binomials not recognized by IUCN